Diuris byronensis, commonly known as the Byron Bay donkey orchid, is a species of orchid which is endemic to the Arakwal National Park in New South Wales. It has one or two grass-like leaves and up to five bright yellow flowers with blackish markings. It has a very limited distribution near Byron Bay.

Description
Flowering occurs in August and September.

Taxonomy and naming
Diuris byronensis was first formally described in 2003 by David Jones from a specimen collected near Byron Bay and the description was published in The Orchadian.

Distribution and habitat
The Byron Bay donkey orchid is only known from a small part of the Arakwal National Park where it grows with sedges and grasses in a rare type of heath known as Byron Bay Dwarf Graminoid Clay Heath.

Conservation
Diuris byronensis is classed as "critically endangered" in the IUCN Red List of Threatened Species and as "endangered" under the New South Wales Threatened Species Conservation Act. The main threats to the species are its limited geographic range, loss of habitat and weed invasion. Projects are underway to protect the habitat of this orchid and other threatened species.

References

byronensis
Orchids of New South Wales
Endemic orchids of Australia
Plants described in 2003